Madison Keys was the defending champion, having won the event in 2012, but decided not to participate in 2013.

Ons Jabeur won the tournament, defeating Coco Vandeweghe in the final, 6–7(0–7), 6–3, 6–3.

Seeds

Main draw

Finals

Top half

Bottom half

References 
 Main draw

Challenger Banque Nationale de Saguenay
Challenger de Saguenay